Katerina Gogou (1940–1993) was a Greek poet, author and actress.

Early life 

From the age of 5 years she started playing in children's plays. However she did not spend pleasant childhood years due to the Second World War and the Axis Occupation of Greece.

Career

Acting 
Katerina Gogou debuted in theater with Dinos Iliopoulos' theater company in the play Ο Κύριος πέντε τοις εκατό (Mr. five percent) in 1961. Most of the films she participated in were Finos Film productions. She became more widely known for roles of cheerful and carefree women like in the movies Το ξύλο βγήκε από τον παράδεισο (The wood came out of paradise - note that "ξύλο", literally translating to "wood", in Greek is an idiom meaning "the act of hitting someone") and Μια τρελή τρελή οικογένεια (A crazy crazy family). She has received the award for best actress in a lead role in Thessaloniki International Film Festival for the movie Το βαρύ πεπόνι (The heavy melon - this phrase in Greek is an idiom referring to someone who tries to appear as an overly masculine man). She made her first cinematographic appearance in the film Ο άλλος (The other one / The other person).

Poetry and writing 
As a poet she was known for her revolutionary and aggressive writing. She was an anarchist and her political identity was often reflected in her poems, such as Υπερασπίζομαι την Αναρχία (I support Anarchy) or Εμένα οι φίλοι μου είναι μαύρα πουλιά (My friends are black birds).

She also wrote some books with one of them, Τρία κλικ αριστερά (Three clicks left), being translated into English in 1983 by Jack Hirschman and published by Night Horn Books in San Francisco    and also into Turkish in 2018 by Turkish author Mahir Ergun and published by Belge International Publishing House in Istanbul.

Selected filmography
 Maiden's Cheek (1959) ..... Lazarou
 Law 4000 (1962) ..... Kleo
 And the Wife Shall Revere Her Husband (1965) ..... Pagona
 What Did You Do in the War, Thanasi? (1971) ..... Froso Karathanasi

References

Further reading

External links 
 IMDb.com bio
 Goodreads.com bio

1940 births
1993 deaths
Modern Greek poets
Suicides in Greece
20th-century Greek women writers
20th-century Greek actresses
20th-century women writers
20th-century Greek poets
1993 suicides
Actresses from Athens
Greek anarchists